Solomon Bloom, known as Sidney Bloom (1 January 1921 – 1 June 2003), was a British Jewish restaurateur, who founded the famous kosher restaurant of Bloom's in London.

References

British restaurateurs
1921 births
2003 deaths